Jordi Ribó (born 5 May 1967) is a Spanish cross-country skier. He competed at the 1988, 1992, 1994 and the 1998 Winter Olympics.

References

1967 births
Living people
Spanish male cross-country skiers
Olympic cross-country skiers of Spain
Cross-country skiers at the 1988 Winter Olympics
Cross-country skiers at the 1992 Winter Olympics
Cross-country skiers at the 1994 Winter Olympics
Cross-country skiers at the 1998 Winter Olympics
People from La Seu d'Urgell
Sportspeople from the Province of Lleida